Peribaea setinervis is a Palearctic species of fly in the family Tachinidae.

Distribution
Austria, United Kingdom, Russia, Sweden.

Hosts
Moths in the families Geometridae and Lasiocampidae.

References

Tachininae
Diptera of Europe
Insects described in 1869